The Kuri Chhu, also known as the Lhozhag Xung Qu (tib. lho brag gzhung chu) or Norbu Lag Qu (tib. nor bu lag chu), is a major river of eastern Bhutan, that has formed a scenic valley with high peaks and steep hills. Kuri Chhu is a tributary of the Manas River system, which is the largest river of Bhutan and a major tributary of the Brahmaputra River that drains most of eastern Bhutan.

Course
The Kuri Chhu originates from the Kula Kangri Glacier in the Tibet Autonomous Region of People's Republic of China where it is known as the Lhozhag Nub Qu (Tibetan: lho brag nub chu, Roman Dzongkha: Lhobrak Chhu) and Xung Qu (Tibetan: gzhung chu), and another origin is the Lhozhag Xar Qu (Tibetan: lho brag shar chu) a.k.a. Damxoi Xung Qu (tib. gtam zhol gzhung chu) originates between the Xoijin Qênri and the Tar Lhari. Further downstream the Kuri Chhu flows in a south-westerly direction and joins the Manas River.

Tributaries
The main tributaries of the Kuri Chhu are the Khoma Chhu, Tangkhar Chhu, the Chuneygang Chhu, the Kilung Chhu, the Rong Chhu, the Nye, and Bagang Chhu and the Dungkhar Chhu.

Topography
Geographically Bhutan forms a giant natural staircase. From this high pass the terrain drops precipitously to the low valleys of  the Kuri Chhu.

On a clear day, one can see Gangkhar Puensum, Bhutan's highest peak, from Thrumshingla pass. After Sengor the road begins its descent into the Kuri Chhu valley. Numerous waterfalls and streams slide down the sharp cliffs and leap onto the road. In some places the road is critically cut into the side of the vertical cliff. Finally the road leaves Thrumshingla National Park area and emerges into the upper part of the large valley of the Kuri Chhu, lush with bamboos and ferns. The area is also good for bird watching. The winding road gradually descends through corn fields, rice terraces and tropical fruit plants begin to appear.

Water sports
Bhutan is emerging as a noted destination for white water sports, although tourism in the country is strictly regulated. The rivers in Bhutan generally rush down very steep slopes with great force and road access is limited. Therefore, only relatively short sections of the main rivers are suitable for kayaking and rafting. Even within these limitations Bhutan is an attractive destination for the recreational kayaker with incredible rivers that are both challenging and are amongst some of the most beautiful in the world. The Kuri Chhu offers three runs—the  upper run and the  middle run are suitable only for kayaking, but the  lower run is suitable for both rafting and kayaking.

Hydropower

Bhutan's hydropower potential is estimated at around 30,000 MW but harnessed capacity is only 460 MW, which includes the 60 MW run-of-the-river type project commissioned in 2001 on Kuri Chhu in Mongar District. Bhutan and India formed Kurichu Project Authority in 1994 to develop a power plant on the  Kuri Chhu.

The Kuri Chhu Hydropower Plant is located in Gyalpozhing, in the Mongar District of Eastern Bhutan. The hydropower plant was formally inaugurated by HRH Trongsa Penlop Jigme Khesar Namgyel Wangchuck and H.E Shri Sudhir Vyas, Ambassador of India to Bhutan, on April 26, 2006. The design capacity is 60 MW (4x15 MW).

Weaving
Some of the villages of traditional "kushitara" weavers, linked with the royal family of Bhutan, are found in the Kuri Chhu valley near Mongar. The entire weaving process for complete kira takes between six months to one year to complete. The Bhutanese prize these textiles so highly that they are considered part of a family's wealth and are used as currency.

See also
Kurtoed Province, the historical "Upper Kur" province
Kurmaed Province, the historical "Lower Kur" province

References

Rivers of Bhutan
Rivers of Tibet
International rivers of Asia